Benue South Senatorial District covers Ado, Agatu, Apa, Obi, Ogbadibo, Ohimini, Oju, Okpokwu, Otukpo and Gboko. Nigeria’s longest serving senator, David Mark who was president of the 6th and 7th Assembly is from here. David Mark was first elected in 1999 and left at the end of his 5th term in the Senate in 2019 (after serving for 20 years). The current representative of Benue South is Abba Moro of the People's Democratic Party, PDP.

List of senators from Benue South

References 

Politics of Benue State
Senatorial districts in Nigeria